Prhovo is a village in Serbia. It is in Pećinci municipality of the Srem District in Vojvodina province. The village has a Serb ethnic majority and its population was 784 as of the 2011 census.

See also
 List of places in Serbia
 List of cities, towns and villages in Vojvodina

References

Populated places in Syrmia